Giovanna Pedroso (born 15 October 1998) is a Brazilian diver. She competed in the synchronized women's 10 metre platform at the 2016 Summer Olympics, where she and Ingrid Oliveira finished 8th out of 8 teams.

References

External links

1998 births
Living people
Brazilian female divers
Olympic divers of Brazil
Divers at the 2016 Summer Olympics
Pan American Games medalists in diving
Pan American Games silver medalists for Brazil
Divers at the 2015 Pan American Games
Divers from Rio de Janeiro (city)
Medalists at the 2015 Pan American Games
Sportspeople from Rio de Janeiro (city)
21st-century Brazilian women